The Institute for Anarchist Studies (IAS) is a non-profit organization founded by Chuck W. Morse in 1996, following the anarcho-communist school of thought, to assist anarchist writers and further develop theoretical aspects of the anarchist movement.

The group's Perspectives on Anarchist Theory is published annually in cooperation with the Justseeds Artists' Cooperative and printed by Eberhardt Press. Each issue is developed around a theme, and offers analysis on various aspects of anarchist theory, in addition to anarchist perspectives on world events, interviews, and book reviews.

References

External links
 
 Interview with IAS collective member
 Lexicon Pamphlet Series
 Anarchist Interventions Series

Organizations established in 1996
Anarchist organizations in the United States
Anarchist websites
American political websites